The Hero of Color City (also known as The Hero of Colour City in the UK) is a 2014 computer-animated musical adventure comedy film directed by Frank Gladstone and written by Jess Kedward, J.P. McCormick, Kirsty Peart, and Rich Raczelowski. The film stars the voice talents of Christina Ricci, Sean Astin, Owen Wilson, E.G. Daily, Jessica Capshaw, Rosie Perez, Tara Strong, Craig Ferguson, Wayne Brady, Jess Harnell, and David Kaye. Original songs and score by Zoë Poledouris and Angel Roché Jr. The film follows Yellow, a yellow crayon and her gang of other crayons who find themselves living in a crayon box to save the unfinished drawings and her dinosaur-like trash can, The Great Waste.

The Hero of Color City was released in a limited theatrical engagement on October 3, 2014 by Magnolia Pictures, followed by releases on streaming and video platforms.

This film was panned by critics.

Synopsis
Every night when Ben goes to bed, his crayons come to life and set out to Color City. Yellow, a timid crayon afraid of everything, accidentally summons two unfinished drawings known as King Scrawl and his sidekick Gnat. The crayons are forced to act quickly in order to save their town before their colors fade.

Cast 
Christina Ricci as Yellow, a yellow crayon who loves to live in color city
Tara Strong as Yellow's singing voice
Rosie Perez as Red, a red crayon who also loves to live in color city
 Jeremy Guskin as Professor Heliotrope/White/Grey/Orange
Jess Harnell as Green, a green crayon who likes to draw stuff 
Wayne Brady as Blue, a blue crayon who also likes to draw stuff
 Sophia Eraklis as Purple, a purple crayon
 Zoë Bright as Madame Pink, a pink crayon
Sean Astin as Bumble Bee
Owen Wilson as Ricky, a fire-breathing dragon and the leader of the drawings. He is seen at the end of the film with Yellow and his assistant Duck.
E.G. Daily as Ben/Mom/Tutti Frutti/Neon Lime
Jessica Capshaw as Duck, a duck and Ricky's assistant
Craig Ferguson as Gnat, a gnat who is King Scrawl's advisor
David Kaye as Black/King Scrawl
Robin Howard as Tangerine/Periwinkle/Aquamarine
 John D. Eraklis as Navy Blue
 Frank Gladstone as Refried Bean/Astronaut
 Tom Lowell as Brown
 Laura Lane as Horse
 Zoe Bright as Opera Singer
 Josh Gladstone as Cow

Reception
On Rotten Tomatoes, the film received a rating of 29%, based on 21 reviews, with an average rating of 4.40/10. On Metacritic, the film has a rating of 33 out of 100, based on 12 critics, indicating "generally unfavorable reviews".

Release
The Hero of Color City had a limited release on October 3, 2014. The film was released on DVD and Blu-ray on December 2, 2014.

References

External links 
 

2014 films
2014 3D films
2014 computer-animated films
English-language Chinese films
English-language Indian films
2010s American animated films
American children's animated adventure films
American children's animated fantasy films
American 3D films
American children's animated musical films
American fantasy adventure films
American musical fantasy films
Indian animated films
Indian 3D films
Chinese animated films
Chinese 3D films
2010s English-language films